Sanibal Orahovac (Cyrillic: Санибал Ораховац; born 12 December 1978) is a Montenegrin former professional footballer who played as a striker or attacking midfielder.

Career
Born in Titograd, what is now Podgorica, the capital of Montenegro, he started playing football at the local club Mladost Podgorica, where he became a member of the first team in 1997 and subsequently played two seasons before transferring to another local but more established club, Budućnost Podgorica, in 1999. He played for Budućnost in the following two seasons and went on to leave the club for Red Star Belgrade in 2001, subsequently spending three seasons with the Serbian club before moving abroad and signing with Portuguese club Vitória de Guimarães in the summer of 2004.

He only played for Vitória in the 2004–05 season and managed to make only six domestic league appearances for the club without scoring any goals. He continued to play in Portugal in the 2005–06 season as he signed with F.C. Penafiel, subsequently making a total of 19 domestic league appearances and scoring one goal for the club in the league. Penafiel were by far the worst-placed team in the Portuguese first division that season and were relegated to the second-division Liga de Honra for the 2006–07 season.

Orahovac left Penafiel upon the end of the 2005–06 season and went on to sign a two-year contract with then German 2. Bundesliga side Karlsruher SC in August 2006, making his league debut for the club on 21 August 2006 as a late substitute in their home match against 1. FC Kaiserslautern. On 31 January 2008, he moved to FC Erzgebirge Aue. Some months later, he moved to SV Wehen Wiesbaden. In July 2009, he was released and signed a one-year contract with FSV Frankfurt on 15 October 2009.

Honours
Red Star Belgrade
First League of Serbia and Montenegro: 2003–04
Serbia and Montenegro Cup: 2002, 2004

References

External links
 
German career stats - FuPa

1978 births
Living people
Footballers from Podgorica
Association football midfielders
Association football forwards
Serbia and Montenegro footballers
Montenegrin footballers
OFK Titograd players
FK Budućnost Podgorica players
Red Star Belgrade footballers
Vitória S.C. players
F.C. Penafiel players
Karlsruher SC players
FC Erzgebirge Aue players
SV Wehen Wiesbaden players
FSV Frankfurt players
Pakhtakor Tashkent FK players
FK Dečić players
First League of Serbia and Montenegro players
Primeira Liga players
Bundesliga players
2. Bundesliga players
Montenegrin First League players
Uzbekistan Super League players
Serbia and Montenegro expatriate footballers
Expatriate footballers in Portugal
Montenegrin expatriate footballers
Expatriate footballers in Germany
Montenegrin expatriate sportspeople in Germany
Expatriate footballers in Uzbekistan
Montenegrin expatriate sportspeople in Uzbekistan
Montenegrin expatriate sportspeople in Portugal